The Petaling Komuter station (formerly Petaling railway station) is a commuter train station located in Kampung Pasir, Lembah Pantai, in southwestern Kuala Lumpur, Malaysia, served by the Port Klang Line. The station was built near the western end of Old Klang Road, where it then merges into the New Pantai Expressway .

The station primarily serves the suburbs along the southern and western part of Old Klang Road, namely Taman OUG and Taman Gembira.

The Petaling station usually busy during rush hours, public holidays and weekends as it is used by workers to reach offices. It is also used by school children as many schools are situated in this area.

The  passes through this station but does not stop here.

Gallery

External links
 Petaling KTM Komuter Station

Railway stations in Kuala Lumpur
Port Klang Line